Hector MacDonald Girvan (10 December 1899–1969) was a Scottish footballer who played in the Football League for Reading and Swindon Town.

References

1899 births
1969 deaths
Scottish footballers
Association football defenders
English Football League players
Parkhead F.C. players
Bo'ness F.C. players
Reading F.C. players
Swindon Town F.C. players
Margate F.C. players
Ramsgate F.C. players